The 1983 WTA Congoleum Classic was a women's tennis tournament played on outdoor hard courts in Palm Springs, California in the United States that was part of the 1983 Virginia Slims World Championship Series. The tournament was held from February 28 through March 6, 1983. Sixth-seeded Yvonne Vermaak won the singles title.

Finals

Singles

 Yvonne Vermaak defeated  Carling Bassett 6–3, 7–5
 It was Vermaak's 1st title of the year and the 2nd of her career.

Doubles

 Kathy Jordan /  Ann Kiyomura defeated  Dianne Fromholtz /  Betty Stöve 6–2, 6–2
 It was Jordan's 1st title of the year and the 20th of her career. It was Kiyomura's 1st title of the year and the 14th of her career.

References

External links
 ITF tournament edition details

 
WTA Congoleum Classic
WTA Congoleum Classic
Tennis tournaments in California